Haakon, also spelled Håkon (in Norway), Hakon (in Denmark), Håkan (in Sweden), or Háukon or Hákon,  is an older spelling of the modern Norwegian form of the Old Norwegian masculine first name Hákon meaning "High Son" from há (high, chosen) and konr (son, descendant, kin). An old English form is Hacon as in Haconby, Hacon's Village. The name appears in Scottish Gaelic as Àcainn, as seen in the place-name Kyleakin, meaning 'Haakon's Narrows', being named after King Haakon IV of Norway.

Haakon or Håkon was the name of several Norwegian rulers (see Norwegian royalty):

Rulers 
 Haakon I of Norway (c. 920–961), known as Haakon the Good
 Haakon Sigurdsson (c. 937–995), also known as Earl Haakon, effective ruler of Norway from about 975 to 995
 Haakon Ericsson (died c. 1029–1030), grandson of Haakon Sigurdsson, ruler of the Kingdom of the Isles from 1016 until his death, and vassal ruler of Norway under Cnut the Great from 1028
 Haakon Ivarsson,  (c. 1027–1080), earl of Västergötland under King Stenkil of Sweden and later earl of Halland under King Sweyn II of Denmark
 Haakon Magnusson of Norway (1068–1095), partially recognised as king from 1093 to 1095
 Haakon II of Norway (1147–1162), known as Haakon Herdebrei
 Haakon III of Norway (1182–1204), known as Haakon Sverreson 
 Haakon IV of Norway (1204–1263), known as Haakon the Old
 Óspakr (died 1230), who took the regnal name Hákon when briefly appointed King of the Isles by Haakon IV in 1230
 Haakon V of Norway (1270–1319), known as Haakon V Magnusson
 Haakon VI of Norway (1340–1380), known as Haakon VI Magnusson
 Haakon VII of Norway (1872–1957), born Prince Carl of Denmark
 Haakon, Crown Prince of Norway, the current heir to the Norwegian throne, who is expected to succeed as Haakon VIII

Others 
 Håkon Bleken (born 1929), Norwegian painter
 Håkon Five (1880–1944), Norwegian politician
 Håkon Gebhardt (born 1969), Norwegian musician and record producer
 Håkon Haugli (born 1969), Norwegian jurist, administrator and politician for the Labour Party
 Haakon Lie (1905–2009), Norwegian politician and centenarian
 Håkon Lundenes (born 1954), Norwegian ice hockey player
 Håkon Opdal (born 1982), Norwegian footballer
 Håkon Skogseid (born 1988), Norwegian footballer
 Håkon Tysdal (1947–2019), Norwegian writer
 Håkon Wium Lie (born 1965), Norwegian web pioneer and inventor of CSS

Fictional characters
 Håkon, one of the two mascots of the 1994 Winter Olympics
 Hakon One-Eye, one of the Ancient Nord Heroes who fights and vanquishes Alduin the World-Eater (a dragon god) in the 2011 video game The Elder Scrolls V: Skyrim
Haakon the presumable big bag dragon from Dragon Age: Inquisition %E2%80%93 Jaws of Hakkon DLC of the Dragon Age Inquisition video game

See also
 Haakon, a Varangian mentioned in the inscription on the Piraeus Lion
 Hakon Jarl runestones
 Haakon County, South Dakota

References

See also
Hagen (surname), a Danish surname
Hakan, a Turkish name

Norwegian masculine given names